This is a list of feature films that include philosophers, or in which philosophers play a significant role.

Biographical films 
Biographical films based on real-life philosophers:
 Adi Shankaracharya (1983) – The life of Adi Shankaracharya, played by Sarvadaman D. Banerjee.
  Augustine of Hippo (1972), played by Dary Berkani, a Roberto Rossellini film.
 Agora (2009) – The life of Hypatia, played by Rachel Weisz.
Beyond Good and Evil (1977) – About the love triangle between Friedrich Nietzsche, Paul Rée and a young Russian intellectual.
  (1972) – The life of Blaise Pascal, played by Pierre Arditi, a Roberto Rossellini film.
 Confucius (2010) – The life of Confucius, played by Chow Yun-fat.
Days of Nietzsche in Turin (2001) – About Nietzsche's time in Turin.
 The Death of Empedocles (1987) – About the pre-Socratic philosopher Empedocles, directed by Danièle Huillet and Jean-Marie Straub.
 Destiny (1997) – The life of Averroes, played by Nour El-Sherif.
 Giordano Bruno (1973) – The life of Giordano Bruno, played by Gian Maria Volonté.
 Hannah Arendt (2012) – The life of Hannah Arendt, played by Barbara Sukowa.
 The Young Karl Marx (2017) – Karl Marx played by August Diehl.
 Trial and Death of Socrates (1939), Socrates played by Ermete Zaccoini, directed by Corrado d'Errico.
 Wittgenstein (1993) – The life of Ludwig Wittgenstein, directed by Derek Jarman.

Documentaries about philosophers 
Feature documentary films about real philosophers:
 Blaise Pascal (2013), part of In Our Time (TV series).
 Derrida (2002) – A documentary about Jacques Derrida.
 Examined Life (2008) – Follows several contemporary philosophers as they try to apply their thought in practice.
 The Pervert's Guide to Cinema (2006) – A film critique of several well-known works by Slavoj Žižek.
Zizek! (2005) – A film following a speaking tour by Slavoj Žižek.
 Badiou (2018) – A film on the life of eminent French philosopher, Alain Badiou.

Starring philosophers 
Films where one or more philosopher play the main role, but that are not otherwise about philosophy:
Irrational Man (2015) – A philosophy professor (Joaquin Phoenix) finds himself in an existential crisis, but eventually discovers a new purpose in life.
 The Life of David Gale (2003) – A philosophy professor (Kevin Spacey), and longtime activist against capital punishment, is sentenced to death for killing a fellow capital punishment abolitionist.
 L'Avenir (2016) – Middle-aged philosophy professor Nathalie Chazeaux's (Isabelle Huppert) life is going through a series of separations.
 Late Marriage (2001) - Zaza (Lior Ashkenazi) is a 31-year-old Georgian-Israeli PhD student, studying the philosophy of religion at Tel Aviv University, whose family is trying to arrange a marriage for him within the Georgian community against his will.

Featuring philosophers 
Films where one or more of the members of the main cast are philosophers:
 Alexander (2004) – Based on the life of Alexander the Great, who is mentored by Aristotle (Christopher Plummer).
 Gladiator (2000) –  The Roman general Maximus is betrayed when Commodus, the ambitious son of Emperor Marcus Aurelius (Richard Harris), murders his father and seizes the throne. 
 The Fall of the Roman Empire (1964) Features Roman emperor and stoic philosopher Marcus Aurelius (Alec Guinness) during the first segment of the film.
 The Oxford Murders (2008) – A student (Elijah Wood) finds out about mysterious killings in Oxford and helped by a philosopher of mathematics (John Hurt), they reveal the patterns used by the killer.
 When Nietzsche Wept (2007) – A Viennese doctor named Josef Breuer (Ben Cross) meets with Friedrich Nietzsche (Armand Assante) to help him deal with his despair

About philosophy 
Films where philosophy is central to the plot:
 I Heart Huckabees (2004) – A comedy with existential themes.
Mindwalk (1990) – A wide-ranging discussion between three individuals.
My Dinner with Andre (1981) – A film featuring philosophical discussions.
My Night at Maud's (1969) – A film centred around philosophical discussions.
Rope (1948) – A film about a Nietzsche-inspired experiment.
Sophie's World (1999) – The story of a teenage girl (Silje Storstein) living in Norway, and a middle-aged philosopher (Tomas von Brömssen), who introduces her to philosophical thinking and the history of philosophy; based on a novel by Jostein Gaarder.
The Fountainhead (1949) – Based on The Fountainhead by Ayn Rand.
The Ister (2004) – a documentary discussing technology, identity and politics, based on the work of Martin Heidegger.
The Stranger (1967) – Based on The Stranger by Albert Camus.
 Waking Life (2001) – The film explores the nature of reality, dreams, consciousness, the meaning of life, free will, and existentialism.

References 

 Philosophical Films, a non-profit resource for philosophy teachers who want to incorporate films into their classes
 "I watch therefore I am: seven movies that teach us key philosophy lessons" by Julian Baggini, Christine Korsgaard, Ursula Coope, Peter Singer, Susan Haack, Kenneth Taylor and Slavoj Žižek.

Philosophers
 
Films about philosophers